A by-election was held in the Safata constituency in Samoa on 14 May 2010. The by-election was precipitated by the disqualification from the Legislative Assembly of Palusalue Fa’apo II for joining the Tautua Samoa Party.  The election was won by Fa’apo.

Candidates
 Palusalue Fa’apo II (Tautua Samoa Party)
 Auseugaefa Tuvaifale Va’asatia Poloma Komiti (Human Rights Protection Party)
 Manu'alesagalala Enokati Posala (Human Rights Protection Party)

Results

References

By-elections to the Legislative Assembly of Samoa
2010 elections in Oceania
2010 in Samoa